Keshod is a town (Now a City) and a Taluka in  Junagadh District.

History on the name
It has been told by many old aged people of this city that the name of the city came from a very interesting incident happened during the Mahabharata time. Krishna ran away with Rukhmani and defeated her brother Rukhmayaa. They were escaping in the jungles for days and nights. During this time Rukhmani washed her hair in the small pond (nowadays called "Utawadiya") available in Keshod. Hair are called "Kesha" and to wash is called "Udd" in Sanskrit, hence the name Keshod came from the addition of these to names in Sanskrit "Kesh-Udd". Since that time the city has been called as Keshod.

Infrastructure
Keshod Airport serves Junagadh district, which was used by Nawab of Junagadh Muhammad Mahabat Khanji III while escaping to Pakistan.

Transportation
Keshod have good and clean Government Bus station and also good private buses as well as. Good frequency for the Junagadh, Somanath, Verval, Rajkot, Ahmedabad, Jamnagar, Gandhinagar and other big cities.

Also Keshod railway station which connect to western railways. to Somnath->Junagadh->Rajkot->Porbandar->Ahemedbad->Jabalpur->Mumbai->Pune.

Keshod Airport is a public airport located in Keshod, It primarily serves the cities of Junagadh and Veraval and the surrounding region.

Terrain
Keshod's landscape is mostly dry. It is 30 kilometres from the sea. During the monsoon months it often rains heavily in and around Keshod but the searing heat means that for a lot of the year there are problems with receiving running water. There are a few small rivers including Sabri which provides water to the city of the Keshod, while Ojat rivers flows through south western part of the Taluka and serves areas of Ghed (ઘેડ) with its water, there is a mountain called Akshaygadh mountain which is around 3 km away from the city and has a height of around 250 meters, some of the villages of Keshod falls under Gir region which is famous for Lions and Keshar Mango as well, Farming is the largest employer with groundnut and cotton being the most popular crop grown.

Industries 
Gujarat's biggest TB Hospital located in Keshod. There is a 150+ Groundnut oil factory in keshod. keshod famous for Chhakado rickshaw Manufacturing. Keshod is Also Known for its furniture manufacturing industries around 300 small and big manufacturing unit are working. Keshod also known for its Kapad (cloth) bazaar in the retail sector.

Climate

See also
Balagam
madhavpur beach 
Loej beach 
Akhodad

References

Cities and towns in Junagadh district